Ephrin-A2 is a protein that in humans is encoded by the EFNA2 gene.

This gene encodes a member of the ephrin family. The protein is composed of a signal sequence, a receptor-binding region, a spacer region, and a hydrophobic region. The EPH and EPH-related receptors comprise the largest subfamily of receptor protein-tyrosine kinases and have been implicated in mediating developmental events, particularly in the nervous system. Based on their structures and sequence relationships, ephrins are divided into the ephrin-A (EFNA) class, which are anchored to the membrane by a glycosylphosphatidylinositol linkage, and the ephrin-B (EFNB) class, which are transmembrane proteins. Posttranslational modifications determine whether this protein localizes to the nucleus or the cytoplasm.

References

Further reading